Mori Station may refer to:
 Mori Station (Hokkaidō), a railway station in Mori, Kayabe District, Hokkaidō, Japan
 Mori Station (Osaka), a railway station in Kaizuka, Osaka Prefecture, Japan
 Enshū-Mori Station, a railway station in Mori, Shuchi District, Prefecture, Japan
 Kawachi-Mori Station, a railway station in Katano, Osaka Prefecture, Japan
 Bungo-Mori Station, a railway station in Kusu, Kusu District, Oita Prefecture, Japan